Bai Yang (born 13. June 1984 in Hebei) is a Chinese international table tennis player.

She has won four World Championship medals. She won the bronze medal at the 2001 World Table Tennis Championships with Zhan Jian, a silver medal at the 2003 World Table Tennis Championships with Liu Guozheng and a silver and bronze at the 2005 World Table Tennis Championships with Liu Guozheng and Guo Yan respectively.

In 2004 she was exiled from the national team following a relationship with fellow international Ma Lin.

See also
 List of table tennis players

References

Chinese female table tennis players
Table tennis players from Hebei
Living people
World Table Tennis Championships medalists
1984 births